Vawter Park is an unincorporated area of shoreline and nearby neighborhoods located on the south shore of Lake Wawasee, Indiana, United States.

History
Vawter Park is located near N. Southshore Drive and E. Vawter Park Road. It was plotted in 1887 by John Terrell Vawter born in Vernon, Indiana, in 1830. John Vawter was in the retail pharmaceutical business in Franklin, Indiana, and later got involved in meat packing and was prominent among bankers, becoming a director and stockholder in a national bank in Franklin. In 1886 Vawter went to his farm on the almost completely unsettled southern shore of the lake to reside.

Vawter Park Hotel
Around 1888, the Vawter Park Hotel was constructed and was followed by a row of cottages extending to the southeast of the hotel. The hotel is said to have been built and furnished with Victorian era gentility. Those settling in this area were Ovid Butler of Indianapolis, Charles A. Sudlow of Indianapolis, Oran Dunn, Dr. Grayston, E.C. Miller, James C. Norris, the Fargo family, an E.C. Miller.

In 1918 or 1919 Vawter Park Hotel burned to the ground. Around 1920 a new hotel was built on the site only to burn down between 1920 and 1925. The South Shore Inn would take its place in subsequent years.

Indiana University Biological Station
A biological research station operated by Indiana University was active just north of Vawter Park Village. This research station was involved in hydrographic mapping and the bathymetry of Wawasee prior to 1895.

South Shore Inn 
The South Shore Inn was a hotel built on the site of the old Vawter Park Hotel. It was a 2-story, 60-room building with a large central semi-circular veranda facing the lake with wings off to both sides. The south end had a bar and restaurant. The hotel had sidewalks descending a series of grass terraces with two goldfish ponds near the seawall flanking the sidewalk. During the great 1943 storm, it took in survivors nearly drown by 6 and  waves. During the 1950s and early 1960s, the hotel attracted visitors and patrons with a water ski jumping show. The South Shore Inn caught fire in the early morning hours of October 29, 1964. Fire departments from Syracuse, nearby North Webster and Milford responded. By 3:53 am the South Shore lay in complete ruin. Loss of the structure was estimated at $250,000. The property lay abandoned for several years eventually becoming condominiums. The location was just north of N. Southshore Drive and E. Vawter Park Road.

Sources

Lilly, Eli. Early Wawasee Days. Indianapolis: Studio Press Inc., 1960. (most text).

Unincorporated communities in Indiana
Geography of Kosciusko County, Indiana
History of Kosciusko County, Indiana